The 2016 Cure Bowl was a post-season American college football bowl game played on December 17, 2016 at Camping World Stadium in Orlando, Florida. The second annual edition of the Cure Bowl is one of the 2016–17 bowl games that concludes the 2016 FBS football season. Sponsored by automotive retailer AutoNation, the game is officially known as the AutoNation Cure Bowl. Notably, the UCF Knights would not lose another game until the 2019 Fiesta Bowl.

Teams
The game features teams from the American Athletic Conference and Sun Belt Conference. On December 4, 2016, it was announced that the 2016 matchup would feature the UCF Knights taking on the Arkansas State Red Wolves. The two teams have only played each other once before, with the Knights defeating the Indians (as ASU was then known as) at Centennial Bank Stadium 31-20 in 1991.

Arkansas State

After finishing the season with a 7-5 record, the Red Wolves will be appearing in their sixth straight bowl game. Arkansas State last played at Camping World Stadium in the 1954 Tangerine Bowl, when the stadium was called the Tangerine Bowl. The Red Wolves' on-campus stadium, Centennial Bank Stadium, is a  drive from Camping World Stadium.

UCF

Following the winless 2015 season, first year coach Scott Frost led the team to a 6-6 record with wins over South Carolina State, FIU, East Carolina, Connecticut, Tulane, and Cincinnati. The Knights have not played at Camping World Stadium since the opening of the on-campus Bright House Networks Stadium following their 2006 season. Prior to that, the team had used the Citrus Bowl (the previous name of Camping World Stadium), which is a  drive from Bright House Networks Stadium, as their home stadium for the previous 30 years.

Officials 
The officials from the game came from the Mountain West Conference.Referee: Kevin Mar

Umpire: Stuart Schake

Head Linesman: George Shoup

Line Judge: David Young

Side Judge: Steve Heiman

Field Judge: Robert "Scooter" Asel

Back Judge: Robert Lewis

Center Judge: Darren Winkley

Replay Official: Judson Howard

Communicator: Bob Bahne

Alternate Official: Tim Crowley

Game summary

Scoring summary

Source:

Statistics

References

2016–17 NCAA football bowl games
2016
2016 Cure Bowl
2016 Cure Bowl
2010s in Orlando, Florida
2016 in sports in Florida
December 2016 sports events in the United States